Amita Emmanuelle Dhiri (born 1965 in Brighton, England) is a British actress.

Personal life
Dhiri was born to a French mother, Antonia and Ugandan-Indian accountant father, Vinod Dhiri. Dhiri is a sub caste of the Sood community of Punjab, India.  She has two younger brothers, and speaks fluent French and Hindi.

She married Bradley Carroll in 1994 and has two daughters.

Career
Dhiri has said that she was very shy when she was little and that this led her into acting. Her first experience of acting came about when a friend of hers who was at film school had a friend who was doing a film for their degree, and asked Dhiri to be in it.

Before going to drama school, Dhiri sang in a touring cabaret group for about 18 months, doing Tina Turner and Janet Jackson impressions

Television

In 1996 she played the role of Djamila "Milly" Nassim in the acclaimed BBC Two drama series This Life, three years after leaving drama college. Milly was a sensible legal high-flyer who had been in a relationship with Egg (played by Andrew Lincoln), since university. One of her notable scenes was in the last episode, when her character punched her colleague Rachel in the jaw.

She has subsequently had many other appearances on British television, including roles in  Absolute Power, The Last Train, Dalziel and Pascoe, Holby City wherein she undertook the role of the raging former partner of General Surgical Consultant Daniel Clifford (played by Peter Wingfield), Silent Witness, Being April and McCallum. More recently, she had a recurring role as Rachel Crawchek in Judge John Deed.

In early 2007, she reunited with original cast members of This Life in a reunion special called This Life +10.

On 14 June 2007, Dhiri joined the long-running British police drama The Bill as DC Grace Dasari. In preparation for the role, she spent time with Kennington police in South London, and had a lesson in driving a police patrol car. She remained in the show until its final episode, broadcast on 31 August 2010.

In 2013 she played Mrs Rattigan in Sky TV's Talking To The Dead

Film

She appeared in the film 24 Hours in London, released in 2000.

Credits
Television

Stage

Radio

Film

Voiceover

References

External links
 

1965 births
Living people
English television actresses
Actresses from Brighton
English people of Indian descent
British actresses of Indian descent